Die ägyptische Helena (The Egyptian Helen), Op. 75, is an opera in two acts by Richard Strauss to a German libretto by Hugo von Hofmannsthal. It premiered at the Dresden Semperoper on 6 June 1928. Strauss had written the title role with Maria Jeritza in mind but, creating quite a sensation at the time, the Dresden opera management refused to pay Jeritza's large fee and cast Elisabeth Rethberg instead as Helen of Troy. Jeritza eventually created the part in Vienna and New York City.

As inspiration for the story, Hofmannsthal used sources from Euripides (Helen). Strauss made changes to the opera in 1933, five years after the premiere, working with the director Lothar Wallenstein and the conductor Clemens Krauss.

Performance history and reception

Roles 

It remains the only major opera in the repertory with a role for an omniscient sea-shell.

Synopsis

Act 1
The mythological past

In her island palace, the sorceress Aithra waits in vain for Poseidon's return. The oracle-like Omniscient Mussel tells her that though Poseidon is far away, he remains steadfast in his love for her. The Mussel then tells of a ship on which the most beautiful woman in the world, Helena (Helen of Troy), is about to be murdered by her husband, Menelas (Menelaus). To save the woman, Aithra conjures a flash storm to shipwreck the passengers, who soon make their way ashore and appear at the palace. Helena has been trying to save her marriage, but Menelas cannot forgive her for her betrayal with Paris at the start of the Trojan War. Bitterly, he has prevented their daughter, Hermione, from knowing her own mother. On land, Menelas once again plans to stab his wife, but the sight of her beauty by moonlight makes him hesitate. To ensure that he doesn't kill her, Aithra invokes elves to torment him; they make him believe that his rival, Paris, is present, and he rushes out to confront the specter. Aithra's magic then helps Helena regain her original youthful beauty, and a lotus drink banishes her anxiety. Servant girls take her to another room.

When Menelas stumbles back in, raving about having surprised and killed Helena and Paris, Aithra gives him the soothing drink as well. Hearing of his conflicted emotions toward his wife, the sorceress tries to tell him that nine years before, when he lost Helena to Paris, the gods actually substituted a wraith to fool Paris; the real Helena was hidden in the castle of Aithra's father on the slopes of the Atlas Mountains. There she remains, asleep, waiting for her husband to wake her; the woman in the next room is the wraith. Aithra pledges to transport Menelas by magic to the castle. Bewildered and hesitant, he gradually yields to the notion that the original Helena will be restored to him. In a pavilion at the foot of the mountain, the two can be reunited. Aithra suggests he use the lotus potion to keep disturbing memories at bay.

Act 2
In the pavilion, Helena awakens and hails the couple's second wedding night (“Zweite Brautnacht”). Menelas, also awakening, still mistrusts his senses. His wife tries to soothe him with more lotus juice, but he catches sight of his sword, which revives jarring memories. Is this woman real or an illusion? Desert horsemen appear, and Altair, prince of the mountains, bows before Helena, offering gifts; his son Da-ud joins in praising her beauty. The scene reminds Menelas of a Trojan celebration in honor of Helena, but he tries to conceal his jealousy as Altair and Da-ud invite him to join a hunting party. Bidding farewell to Helena, and still uncertain of her identity, he leaves for the hunt. Aithra appears as one of the serving girls and cautions Helena that one of the vials she has packed contains a potion of forgetfulness but the other a potion of recollection. Against Aithra's strong advice Helena declares that recollection will be necessary to save her marriage; the fantasy of returning to an unblemished past is not a genuine solution.

At a sign from Helena, the maidservants withdraw when Altair returns, paying bold court to her and inviting her to a banquet in her honor. Even when word arrives that Menelas has killed Da-ud during the hunt, Altair continues his suit. He steps away, though, when the youth's body is brought in, followed by Menelas, who remains confused, thinking it is Paris he has killed. Again defying Aithra's counsel, Helena orders the potion of recollection prepared as time for the feast draws near. Menelas now imagines that the real Helena has died, and he resolves to join her in death; the Helena before him is surely the wraith. When he takes what he thinks is the potion of death, however, he sees the dead Helena as the living one: both are united. Altair and his cohorts seize and separate the couple, but Aithra reveals a phalanx of Poseidon's soldiers, who are escorting the child Hermione. Recognizing Aithra the sorceress, Altair bows to her power. Hermione, reunited at last with her parents, will go home with them to begin their life together.

Instrumentation 

Although not dense like the orchestration for Elektra and Salome, it is still impressive:
 Woodwind: 4 flutes (3rd and 4th doubling on piccolo), 2 oboes, English horn, 3 clarinets, bass clarinet, 3 bassoons (3rd doubling on contrabassoon)
 Brass: 6 horns, 6 trumpets, 3 trombones, tuba
 Percussion: timpani, bass drum, tamtam, snare drum, cymbals,
 Other instruments: glockenspiel, celesta, 2 harps, organ, strings (16.14.12.10.8)
 Stage band: 6 oboes, 6 clarinets, 4 horns, 2 trumpets, 4 trombones, timpani, 4 triangles, 2 tambourines, wind machine

Recordings
There is a recording of a few excerpts made in 1928 with Fritz Busch conducting the Berlin State Opera Orchestra with Rose Pauly singing Helena. Two of these ("Bei jener Nacht" and "Zweite Brautnacht") are included in the Preiser Records collection Richard Strauss Opera Scenes – Historical Recordings 1928–43 released in 2000. Recordings of the complete opera include:

References

Further reading
 
Kennedy, Michael, in Holden, Amanda (ed.), The New Penguin Opera Guide, New York: Penguin Putnam, 2001.

External links
 
BBC opera guide
 Act 1, Act 2, Prinzregententheater, Munich 1956, Joseph Keilberth; Helena: Leonie Rysanek, Menelaus: Bernd Aldenhoff, Aithra: Annelies Kupper, Altair: Hermann Uhde, Da-ud: Richard Holm, Omniscient sea-shell: Ira Malaniuk

Operas by Richard Strauss
German-language operas
1928 operas
Operas based on classical mythology
Operas
Music for orchestra and organ
Operas based on works by Euripides